The year 1617 in science and technology involved some significant events.

Astronomy
 Johannes Kepler begins to publish his Epitome astronomiæ Copernicanæ setting out his theory of elliptic orbits.

Mathematics
 Napier’s Bones, a multiplication device invented by John Napier (who dies on April 4), is described in his Rabdologiæ, published in Edinburgh.
 Henry Briggs  publishes Logarithmorum Chilias Prima, a modification of Napier's logarithms into common logarithms.

Medicine
 The Worshipful Society of Apothecaries of London is granted a royal charter, separating it from the Grocers.

Births
 July 13 (bapt.) – Ralph Cudworth, Cambridge Platonist (died 1688).

Deaths
 January 29 – William Butler, Irish alchemist (at sea) (born c. 1534).
 February 6 – Prospero Alpini, Italian physician and botanist (born 1553).
 February 11 – Giovanni Antonio Magini, Italian astronomer (born 1555).
 April 4 – John Napier of Merchiston, mathematician (born 1550).
 May 7 – David Fabricius, Frisian astronomer (born 1564).
 December – William Butler, English physician (born 1535).

References

 
17th century in science
1610s in science